Utran is a census town in Surat district in the Indian state of Gujarat. Utran Nearest airport Surat  (21.9 km). Nearest railway station Utran railway station.

Geography
It has an average elevation of 12 metres (39 feet).

Demographics
 India census, Utran had a population of 12,894. Males constitute 54% of the population and females 46%. Utran has an average literacy rate of 73%, higher than the national average of 59.5%: male literacy is 80%, and female literacy is 64%. In Utran, 13% of the population is under 6 years of age.

See also 
List of tourist attractions in Surat

References

Suburban area of Surat
Cities and towns in Surat district